RAF Abbots Bromley is a former Royal Air Force Relief Landing Ground (RLG) located  north-west of the village of Abbots Bromley, Staffordshire. The airfield opened during 1940 and closed on 31 March 1949 being the satellite of RAF Burnaston.

Based units
The following units were here at some point:
 No. 5 Elementary Flying Training School RAF flying de Havilland Tiger Moths.
 No. 16 Elementary Flying Training School RAF
 No. 21 Maintenance Unit RAF

The airfield was also used after the Second World War for storing ammunition.

Current use

There is currently not much of the original site left partly because of the fact it had grass runways and partly due to the period of time elapsed however a guard house and a single Robin hangar remain with part of the site becoming a chicken farm.

See also
 List of former Royal Air Force stations

References

External links
 The Wartime Memories Project - RAF Abbots Bromley

Royal Air Force stations in Staffordshire
Royal Air Force stations of World War II in the United Kingdom
1940 establishments in England
1949 disestablishments in England